Paul Byrne may refer to:

Paul Byrne (footballer, born 1972), Irish footballer, former Celtic and Southend United player
Paul Byrne (soccer, born 1982), South African footballer, former Port Vale player
Paul Byrne (footballer, born 1986), Irish football player currently at Ballarat Red Devils
Paul Byrne (hurler) (born 1949), Irish retired hurler
Paul Byrne (journalist) (born 1978), Irish journalist, formerly of the BBC and RT
Paul Byrne (runner) (born 1976), Australian gold medalist at the 1994 World Junior Championships in Athletics
Paul L. Byrne, served in the California legislature
P. J. Byrne (Paul Jeffrey Byrne, born 1974), American film and television actor

See also
Paul Burns (disambiguation)
Paul Bern (1889–1932), American film producer